Elatia (Greek: Ελατιά or Ancient Greek: Ἐλάτεια) may refer to:

Elatia, Drama (Ελατιά)
Elatia (mountain), in Drama and Kavala, Greek Macedonia
Elatia, Zakynthos (Ελατιά)
Elateia (Ἐλάτεια), an ancient city-state of Phocis
Elateia (Aeolis), a town of ancient Aeolis, now in Turkey
Elateia (Epirus) (Ἐλάτεια), a town of ancient Epirus
Elateia (Thessaly) (Ἐλάτεια), a town of ancient Thessaly
Elateia, Florina (Ἐλάτεια), a destroyed village in the Florina region whose artifacts are held in the Museum of Folklore and History (Drosopigi) 
Elateia, Larissa (Ἐλάτεια), a village in the municipality of Larissa
Amfikleia-Elateia
 (Ἐλάτεια), a village in the Phthiotis region

See also
Elati (disambiguation)